Benjamin Philip Pringle (born 25 July 1988) is an English professional footballer who plays as a midfielder for  side Altrincham.

He has notably played for Derby County, Rotherham United, Fulham and Preston North End with further spells in the Football League with Torquay United, Ipswich Town, Oldham Athletic, Grimsby Town, Tranmere Rovers, Gillingham and Morecambe. Prior to his professional career he had played at Non-League level for Newcastle Blue Star, Morpeth Town and Ilkeston Town.

Early life
Pringle was born and raised in Whitley Bay, Tyne and Wear.

Career

Early career
Pringle started his career at Wallsend Boys Club, before joining the youth system at West Bromwich Albion.

After being released by West Bromwich Albion, he joined Non League side Newcastle Blue Star  before a spell at Morpeth Town.

Ilkeston Town
In 2008 joined Ilkeston Town. At Ilkeston he made a total of 54 competitive first team appearances, scoring 6 goals.

Derby County
In May 2009 it was announced he was moving to Derby County on a one-year deal, with the move set to be completed in July.

He made his Derby debut as an 80th-minute substitute against Peterborough United on 8 August 2009. The following game of the 2009–10 football season, Pringle started his first game for Derby in the League Cup 2–1 loss to League Two side Rotherham United.

Pringle signed an extension to his Derby deal to take him through to the end of the 2010–11 season on 11 December 2009. Pringle was captain of the Derby County reserves side that won the 2009–10 Central League Central Section title and was also named the club's Young Player of the Season for the campaign.
He was handed his first League start in the final game of the 2009–10 season against Cardiff City in a 2–0 win and earned the supporter's Man of the Match award. In February 2011, Pringle's contract was extended until summer 2012.

Torquay United (loan)
In March 2011, Pringle joined then League Two outfit Torquay United on a months loan. Pringle spent just 19 days of the loan at Torquay, playing five games, but returned to Derby after expressing a desire to fight for a place in the Derby first team rather than remain at Plainmoor.

Upon his return to Derby, despite having had his contract extended at the end of the 2010–11 campaign, Pringle was told he was free to find another club.

Rotherham United
On 3 June 2011, it was revealed he had agreed personal terms with Rotherham United. The transfer was confirmed later that day, with Pringle joining The Millers on a free transfer, signing a two-year contract. He made his first team debut for Rotherham at home to Oxford United on 6 August 2011, and scored his first goal for the club in a 2–1 win over Crewe Alexandra on 16 August.

He had made 9 appearances for Rotherham up until mid-October but following his substitute appearance versus Bristol Rovers he had not played again for them as of mid-February. However, he was an unused sub in Rotherham's game against Burton Albion on 18 February. Pringle's form, contributed greatly to the clubs' automatic promotion to League One at the end of the 2012–13 season.

On 18 January 2013, Pringle signed a new two-and-a-half-year contract with Rotherham. His goals and assists during the 2013–14 season helped Rotherham reach the League One playoff final. Pringle played in the final, and after a 2–2 draw, Rotherham earned promotion after beating Leyton Orient 4–3 on penalties to earn a second successive promotion.

At the end of the 2013–14 season, Pringle was voted in the 2013–14 Football League One PFA Team of the Year.

On 9 August 2014, Pringle started for Rotherham in their opening fixture of The Championship season in a 1–0 defeat against his former club Derby County. On 23 August 2014, Pringle scored his first goal in The Championship with a winner in Rotherham's 1–0 victory against Millwall.

On 9 January 2015, Rotherham agreed a fee with Millwall F.C. for Pringle, however Pringle turned down the move to the club. On 27 January 2015, Pringle scored his second goal of The Championship season in a 4–2 victory against Bolton Wanderers where he was also named man of the match.

Fulham
On 19 June 2015, Pringle signed for Fulham on a two-year contract, he joined goalkeeper Andy Lonergan in signing for the club on the same day.

Ipswich Town (loan)
Pringle joined Ipswich Town on an initial one-month loan on 12 February 2016.

Preston North End
On 4 July 2016, Pringle signed for Preston North End on a three-year contract for an undisclosed fee.

On 31 August 2018, Pringle joined Grimsby Town on a season-long loan, however, his loan was cut short, with Pringle joining League Two rivals Tranmere Rovers on 22 January 2018

He was released by Preston at the end of the 2018–19 season.

Gillingham
In September 2019, Pringle joined Gillingham on a contract intended to run until the end of the season. He went on to make 11 appearances for the Kent side in all competitions,  but was released at the conclusion of the 2019–20 season.

Morecambe
On 10 August 2020, Pringle joined League Two side Morecambe on a one-year deal. He was released by the club's new manager in June 2021 after the club had won promotion through the playoffs.

Altrincham
On 3 August 2021, Pringle joined National League side Altrincham following his release from Morecambe.

Honours
Ilkeston Town
Northern Premier League Premier Division play-offs: 2009

Rotherham United
Football League Two runner-up: 2012–13
Football League One play-offs: 2014

Tranmere Rovers
EFL League Two play-offs: 2019
Morecambe

 EFL League Two play-offs: 2021

Individual
PFA Team of the Year: 2013–14 League One
Derby County Young Player of the Year: 2009–10
Ilkeston Town Player of the Year: 2008–09

References

External links

1988 births
Living people
People from Whitley Bay
Footballers from Tyne and Wear
English footballers
Association football midfielders
Wallsend Boys Club players
West Bromwich Albion F.C. players
Newcastle Blue Star F.C. players
Morpeth Town A.F.C. players
Ilkeston Town F.C. (1945) players
Derby County F.C. players
Torquay United F.C. players
Rotherham United F.C. players
Fulham F.C. players
Ipswich Town F.C. players
Preston North End F.C. players
Grimsby Town F.C. players
Oldham Athletic A.F.C. players
Gillingham F.C. players
Morecambe F.C. players
Altrincham F.C. players
Northern Premier League players
English Football League players